Martin "Ash" Ashford may refer to:

Martin "Ash" Ashford (Casualty), a fictional character on the television series Casualty
Martin Ashford (Home and Away), a fictional character on the television series Home and Away

See also
Martin Ashford (disambiguation)
Ashford (surname)